Mark Anthony Jones (born April 10, 1961) is a retired American professional basketball player. He played point guard. Jones played college basketball at St. Bonaventure before being drafted by the New York Knicks as the 82nd overall pick in the 4th round of the 1983 NBA draft. He never played for the Knicks and instead played six games in the NBA for the New Jersey Nets during the  season.

Biography
Jones played for four seasons at St. Bonaventure University and averaged 15.2 points per game. In 1982 he was named to the All-Eastern Athletic Association first team and the following year he made the second team, with the conference being renamed the Atlantic 10 Conference. Jones is currently the ninth leading scorer in St. Bonaventure history.

Jones was drafted by the New York Knicks as the 82nd overall pick in the 4th round of the 1983 NBA Draft. He was cut from the final roster shortly before the start of the  season. Weeks later he signed with the New Jersey Nets and he scored 7 points in six games. Jones played the rest of the season in the Continental Basketball Association (CBA), appearing in 29 games for the Albany Patroons. He averaged 10.8 points per game playing for coach Phil Jackson as the Patroons won the CBA championship.

References

1961 births
Living people
African-American basketball players
Albany Patroons players
American men's basketball players
Basketball players from New York (state)
New Jersey Nets players
New York Knicks draft picks
Point guards
Sportspeople from Rochester, New York
St. Bonaventure Bonnies men's basketball players
21st-century African-American people
20th-century African-American sportspeople